Rookhope is a village in County Durham, in England. A former lead and fluorspar mining community, it first existed as a group of cattle farms in the 13th Century. It is situated in the Pennines to the north of Weardale. W. H. Auden once called Rookhope "the most wonderfully desolate of all the dales".

In the 2001 census Rookhope had a population of 267.

The village had two public houses, the Rookhope Inn and the Swallow's Rest on the fell surrounding Rookhope but now closed (May 2022), both popular with cyclists on the coast to coast cycling route which runs from Sunderland on the east coast to Whitehaven or Workington on the West Cumbrian coast of northern England.

Mining
Rookhope was once the centre of lead and fluorspar mining in the Dale.  The last mine closed in 1999.  The shaft head at Grove Rake was recently saved from demolition.

Rookhope Arch

A local landmark is the Rookhope Arch at Lintzgarth, a few hundred yards west up the valley; one of the few remaining parts of the  Rookhope Chimney.  This "horizontal" chimney (parallel to the ground, which actually rises steeply to the moors) was used to carry poisonous flue gases from the Rookhope lead smelting works up onto the high moor.  Periodically, lead and silver carried over in the gases and deposited in the chimney were dug out and recovered, rather than going to waste.

St John the Evangelist church
The original St John's in Rookhope was built in 1822, but at the end of the 19th century it was pulled down and rebuilt in its current position in 1905. The church closed in 2014. It is a Grade II listed building.

Governance
Rookhope is in the parliamentary constituency of North West Durham, for which Richard Holden is the first Conservative Member of Parliament.

For Local Government purposes it is in the  Weardale Ward of Durham County Council. For Parish council purposes it is part of Stanhope Parish Council.

Literary references

The Rookhope Ride
The Rookhope Ride  is a border ballad rescued and noted down by Joseph Ritson from the chanting of George Collingwood of Boltsburn near Rookhope about 1785. The date of the action (a raid) is precise: 6 December 1569, when robbers from Tynedale made a foray into Weardale.

W. H. Auden
The poet W. H. Auden was familiar with this whole area of the North Pennines and its derelict lead mines, having visited Rookhope at the age of 12 in 1919. In his poem New Year Letter (1941) he wrote that it was in Rookhope that he first became aware of himself as an individual:

In this poem he refers to dropping a pebble down a mine-shaft on top of neighbouring Bolt's Law.

References

External links
 Past Perfect: Old Rookhope (lead working)
 In and Around the former lead mining village of Rookhope; and Rookhope fields & fells: A mineral valleys project walk

Villages in County Durham
Stanhope, County Durham